Mount Airy may refer to:

Places in the United States
Mount Airy, Georgia
Mount Airy, Louisiana
Mount Airy, Maryland
 Mount Airy (Davidsonville, Maryland), listed on the NRHP in Maryland
 Mount Airy (Sharpsburg, Maryland), listed on the NRHP in Maryland
 Mount Airy Mansion, in Rosaryville State Park
Mount Airy, Missouri
Mount Airy, New Jersey 
Mount Airy, New York, a neighborhood
Mount Airy (Ulster County, New York), a mountain
Mount Airy, North Carolina 
Mount Airy, Cincinnati, Ohio, a neighborhood
Mount Airy, Philadelphia, a neighborhood within the city of Philadelphia, Pennsylvania
Mount Airy (SEPTA station), a SEPTA train station in the neighborhood
Mt. Airy (Cordova, Tennessee), listed on the NRHP in Tennessee
Mount Airy, Virginia (disambiguation), the name of several places in Virginia
Mount Airy (Leesville, Virginia), listed on the NRHP in Virginia
Mount Airy, Richmond County, Virginia, listed on the NRHP in Virginia
Mount Airy (Verona, Virginia), listed on the NRHP in Virginia
Mount Airy (Warsaw, Virginia), listed on the NRHP in Virginia
Mount Airy Township, Surry County, North Carolina

Other uses
 Mount Airy Casino Resort, in Mount Pocono, Pennsylvania
 Mount Airy Forest, a park in Cincinnati, Ohio
 Mount Airy, a peak in the Shoshone Mountains, Nevada